The Middle Army Division (14. förd), was a division of the Swedish Army which operated in various forms from 1941 to 1997. Its staff was located in Linköping Garrison in Linköping.

History
The Middle Army Division was raised on 1 August 1941 as the XIV Division (XIV. fördelningen), a doubling division of the IV Division. The army division was directly subordinate to the military commander of the IV Military Area, while the Svea Life Guards was responsible for raising and mobilization of the army division staff. In 1966, the mobilization responsibility for the army division was transferred to the Life Grenadier Regiment in Linköping. On 1 October 1966, the designation was changed from being given in Roman numerals to Arabic numerals, that is, the division was termed the 14th Division (14. fördelningen). On 1 July 1984, the mobilization responsibility for the army division was transferred to Södermanland Regiment (P 10/Fo 43) in Strängnäs.

On 1 July 1991, the Bergslagen Military Area and the Eastern Military Area merged and formed the Middle Military Area. The army division, together with the Eastern Army Division, thus came to be subordinate to the military commander of the Middle Military Area. Through the Defence Act of 1992, the Riksdag decided that the Swedish Armed Forces' war organization should reflect the peace organization. As of 1 July 1994, the army division staff, together with the Eastern Army Division, came to be organized as cadre-organized units within the Middle Military Area. With this reorganization, the division was relocated to Linköping Garrison.

Prior to the Defence Act of 1996, the Swedish government proposed to the Riksdag that the war organization to be reduced. Where, among other things, the three military areas would be covered by each division staff. Of the six division staffs, three with division units and 13 army brigades would be maintained. Within the Middle Military Area, the government proposed that the Middle Army Division should be disbanded. On 13 December 1996, the Riksdag adopted the government's bill, which meant that the Middle Army Division was disbanded on 31 December 1997.

Barracks and training areas
Although the division was mobilized by other units, it was in peace time grouped together with the military area staff. When the division staff was raised, it came to be co-located with the Eastern Military Area Staff at Stureplan in Stockholm. In 1949, the two staffs were moved to the barracks of the Life Regiment of Horse (K 1) at Lidingövägen 28 in Stockholm. On 14 June 1963, both staff were transferred to a new property complex in Strängnäs Garrison. When the staff became independent on 1 July 1994, the staff was placed to the barracks area in Linköping Garrison.

Heraldry and traditions

Coat of arms
The coat of arms of the Middle Army Division used from 1994 to 1997. Blazon: "Azure, the provincial badge of Östergötland, a griffin with dragon wing and tail or, armed and langued gules. The shield surmounted two batons, charged with open crowns azure in saltire or".

Medals
In 1995, the Mellersta arméfördelningens förtjänstmedalj ("Middle Army Division Medal of Merit") in silver (MellfördSM) of the 8th size was established. In 1997, this medal was renamed Mellersta fördelningens (14.förd) minnesmedalj ("Middle Division (14.förd) Commemorative Medal") in silver (MellfördSMM). The medal ribbon is blue with red edges followed by a yellow stripe.

Commanding officers
1941–1994: ?
1994–1996: Senior Colonel Hans Berndtson
1996–1997: Lieutenant Colonel Anders Ihrén (acting)

Names, designations and locations

See also
Division

Footnotes

References

Notes

Print

Divisions of Sweden
Military units and formations established in 1941
Military units and formations disestablished in 1997
1941 establishments in Sweden
1997 disestablishments in Sweden
Disbanded units and formations of Sweden
Stockholm Garrison
Linköping Garrison
Strängnäs Garrison